Goonbell is a hamlet near St Agnes (where the 2011 census population was included) in Cornwall, England. The place name was Goen Bell in 1735, and Goonbell 1826. It is from the Cornish for far moor, goon + pell.

Goonbell is located east of the now defunct St Agnes railway station, a stop on the Truro and Newquay Railway. Goonbell itself had a halt on the same line.

References

Hamlets in Cornwall